Gregory Robert Hancock (born April 18, 1963 in Seattle, Washington, USA) is a Professor of Measurement, Statistics and Evaluation. He is the current University of Maryland head of the Educational Department of Measurement and Statistics (EDMS) program. Hancock also co-hosts the podcast Quantitude with Patrick Curran. He is internationally known for the voice of Jiffy from the podcast.

References

External links
 University of Maryland EDMS website
 Website for the Center for Integrated Latent Variable Research

1963 births
Living people
University of Maryland, College Park faculty